Osman Faruk is a Bangladesh Nationalist Party politician and a former minister of education of Bangladesh. He served as a Jatiya Sangsad member representing the Kishoreganj-4 constituency.

Career
In 2016, he was investigated for war crimes during the Bangladesh Liberation War. He has denied involvement in war crimes. He is an adviser to the former Prime Minister of Bangladesh, Khaleda Zia.

References

Living people
People from Kishoreganj District
Bangladesh Nationalist Party politicians
Education ministers of Bangladesh
8th Jatiya Sangsad members
Year of birth missing (living people)
Place of birth missing (living people)
St. Gregory's High School and College alumni